Maika Jae Rivera Tanpoco (born October 27, 1995), professionally known as Maika Rivera, is a Filipino tennis player, model and actress. She was one of the few popular tennis players in the Philippines along with Tin Patrimonio.

In 2016, Tanpoco changed her screen name to Maika Rivera as she became a member of Star Magic, an ABS-CBN Talent Agency. She joined the cast of The Blood Sisters as the evil cousin of Erich Gonzales character.

Rivera started her career as one of the Girltrends of the variety show, It's Showtime, created by ABS-CBN and her villain role in Always Be My Maybe created by Star Cinema. Since then, she became a star magic artist of ABS and began appearing on their television dramas such as Magpahanggang Wakas, Maalaala Mo Kaya and Ipaglaban Mo!. Previously in 2017, she joined the cast of La Luna Sangre and played the role Malina, the antagonist of the cast. In September 2017, she joined the cast of Wildflower as a recurring guest character Stefanie to Lily (Maja Salvador) and Diego (Joseph Marco). Began 2018, Rivera joined the cast of The Blood Sisters as Andrea, the main antagonist of the series. She became famous because of her role of that drama suspense TV series.

Career
She lost to Marian Capadocia in the finals of Philippine Columbian Association in November 2014.

Showbiz career
Rivera's film debut is her antagonist role in Always Be My Maybe by Star Cinema, starring Arci Muñoz and Gerald Anderson. She also became a member of Girl Trends on ABS-CBN's noontime show It's Showtime.

2016–present: Drama roles 
Recently, Rivera made her television acting debut via Magpahanggang Wakas, where she played Chesca Lozado, Jena and Tristan's mean and tough daughter and shared credits with Muñoz, Gelli de Belen and John Estrada. She will be paired up with Marco Gumabao. Later, after appearing in that show she appeared in some episodes in Maalaala Mo Kaya and played various roles in that show. She was also seen in Ipaglaban Mo! episodes.

2017–present: Main, recurring and villain roles 
Maika became a regular guest in It's Showtime and appeared in the show's segment Girltrends as a member, FUNanghalian as a member/leader (Team Girls), Cash-Ya! Kaya! and COPY-CUT. Later, she appeared in La Luna Sangre along with co-stars Kathryn Bernardo, Daniel Padilla, Angel Locsin, Richard Gutierrez and others and she portrayed Malina, a cruel and unsympathetic vampire, Supremo's loyal servant and Malia and Tristan's enemy, Malina dies at the LLU massacre after Malia killed the other evil vampires that kills humans.

Right after La Luna Sangre, she played another recurring role in the one of the most watched TV series in Philippines Wildflower, she portrayed Stefanie Oytengco, Divine's eldest daughter and the one who manages Divine's jewelry shop, in the series her mother (Divine) was kidnapped by Lily Cruz to gain information about Emilia's criminal acts. Later after Lily successfully destroys Emilia's illegal jewelry business. Stefani was killed by Emilia's hired killers along with Divine and her siblings. Later after playing a special recurring role in that series.

She appeared in the Philippine television drama-action-suspense series topbilled by Erich Gonzales in three characters: Erika, Carrie, and Agatha. Produced by Dreamscape Entertainment and directed by Jojo Saguin, that tackles the issue surrogacy, The Blood Sisters along with Erich Gonzales, Ejay Falcon, Enchong Dee, and AJ Muhlach where she played the evil cousin of Erich Gonzales character.

Off the Court
She appears for Metro magazine with volleyball superstar Alyssa Valdez of Ateneo Lady Eagles and Men's Health Philippines along with another volleyball superstar Cha Cruz, who was included in the Top 100 of FHM Philippines 100 Sexiest Women along with Rachel Anne Daquis.

Filmography

Television

Movies

References 

1995 births
Living people
Sportspeople from Angeles City
Filipino female models
Filipina gravure idols
Filipino female tennis players
Star Magic
Filipino film actresses
Filipino television actresses
Filipino child actresses

External links